Agia Marina may refer to several locations:

In Greece:

 Agia Marina, Achaea, in the municipal unit Tritaia, Achaea
 Agia Marina, Crete, near Chania, Crete
 Agia Marina, Elis, in Elis 
 Agia Marina, Kavala, in Kavala (regional unit)
 Agia Marina, Leros, in Leros, Aegean Islands
 Agia Marina, Zakynthos, on Zakynthos, Ionian Islands
 Agia Marina, Kasos, on Kasos, Dodecanese

In Cyprus:

 Agia Marina (Skylloura), in Northern Cyprus
 Agia Marina, Nicosia, in Nicosia District
 Ayia Marina Khrysokhous, in Paphos District, north of Polis 
 Ayia Marina Kelokedharon, in Paphos District, northeast of Paphos

Ships
, a Hansa A Type cargo ship in service 1966-67

See also 

 Saint Marina (disambiguation)